Victoire is a populated locality in the Canadian province of Saskatchewan. Nearby towns include Ormeaux (4.2 km), Pascal (7.6 km), and Eldred (11.3 km).

Victoire is found within the 306 area code.

References

Unincorporated communities in Saskatchewan
Division No. 13, Saskatchewan